Schinznach may refer to:

Schinznach-Bad, Aargau, Switzerland
Schinznach-Dorf, a former municipality in Aargau, Switzerland
Schinznach, a new municipality created in 2014 in Aargau, Switzerland